The South Sierra Wilderness is a federally designated wilderness area in the Southern Sierra Nevada, in eastern California.

Geography
It is managed by the U.S. Forest Service, and within Sequoia National Forest and Inyo National Forest.

The South Sierra Wilderness is the southernmost Forest Service-managed section of a continuous chain of wilderness areas protecting the Sierra Nevada crest from Walker Pass to Lake Tahoe.

The Wild and Scenic South Fork of the Kern River bisects the wilderness on the east side, in a north–south direction.

Ecology
Wildlife includes the large Monache mule deer herd, the sensitive Sierra Nevada red fox, pine martens, mountain lions, and American black bears.

Flora

Two very different landscapes with distinct habitats are protected within the South Sierra Wilderness:
The southern portion is the lower Kern Plateau landform, with low, forested ridges, narrow meadows, and woodlands of Jeffrey pine (Pinus jeffreyi), red fir (Abies magnifica) and lodgepole pine (Pinus contorta).  
The northern portion is more mountainous, and includes the alpine flora of Olancha Peak and Round Mountain.

Ceanothus pinetorum is not currently state or federally listed under the Endangered Species Act, but is considered by the California Native Plant Society as "uncommon enough that their status should be monitored regularly".

Rare wildflowers include Kern Canyon clarkia (Clarkia xantiana ssp. parviflora) and goosefoot yellow violet (Viola pinetorum ssp. grisea), both are also endemic to California.

Recreational activities
Recreational activities include backpacking, day hiking, fishing, rock climbing, mountaineering, skiing and snowshoeing. The majority of trail users are summer grazing allotment permittees, and autumn hunters.

Hiking trails
There are six trailheads leading into the wilderness, and one campground, Kennedy Meadows, providing access to:
 the Pacific Crest Trail.
 the Wildrose Trail —  in length and travels through pinyon pine forests.

See also
Flora of the Sierra Nevada
Protected areas of the Sierra Nevada
Fauna of the Sierra Nevada

References

Bibliography
Adkinson, Ron  Wild Northern California, The Globe Pequot Press, 2001

External links

 Inyo National Forest section on wilderness areas.
 Sequoia National Forest wilderness areas.

Wilderness areas of California
Protected areas of the Sierra Nevada (United States)
Inyo National Forest
Sequoia National Forest
Protected areas of Inyo County, California
Protected areas of Tulare County, California
IUCN Category Ib
1984 establishments in California
Protected areas established in 1984